There are two River Winterbornes in Dorset, England.

The rivers only flow overground during the winter, hence the name. They both flow through a number of villages with a first name of "Winterborne" or “Winterbourne”.

The North Winterborne flows through the following villages in Dorset from its source to the point where it joins the River Stour:

 Winterborne Houghton
 Winterborne Stickland
 Winterborne Clenston
 Winterborne Whitechurch
 Winterborne Kingston
 Winterborne Muston
 Anderson
 Winterborne Tomson
 Winterborne Zelston
 Almer
 Sturminster Marshall

The river flows at first southwards and then eastwards.

The South Winterborne flows through the following places in Dorset from its source to the point where it joins the River Frome.

 Winterbourne Abbas
 Winterbourne Steepleton
 Winterborne St Martin
 Winterborne Monkton
 Winterborne Herringston
 Winterborne Came

See also
 Winterbourne (stream)

References 

Winterborne
1Winterbourne